Aterpia is a genus of moths belonging to the subfamily Olethreutinae of the family Tortricidae.

Species
Aterpia anderreggana (Guenée, 1845)
Aterpia approximana (Heinrich, 1919)
Aterpia asema (Diakonoff, 1973)
Aterpia bicolor (Kawabe, 1978)
Aterpia catarrhactopa (Meyrick, 1938)
Aterpia chalybeia (Falkovitsh, 1966)
Aterpia circumfluxana (Christoph, 1881)
Aterpia corticana (Denis & Schiffermüller, 1775)
Aterpia cretata (Diakonoff, 1953)
Aterpia flavens (Falkovitsh, 1966)
Aterpia flavipunctana (Christoph, 1882)
Aterpia gypsopa (Diakonoff, 1953)
Aterpia haematina (Diakonoff, 1953)
Aterpia hemicapnodes (Diakonoff, 1953)
Aterpia hemicyclica (Diakonoff, 1953)
Aterpia issikii (Kawabe, 1980)
Aterpia lucifera (Meyrick, 1909)
Aterpia maturicolor (Diakonoff, 1973)
Aterpia mensifera (Meyrick, 1916)
Aterpia microchlamys (Diakonoff, 1983)
Aterpia monada Razowski, 2013
Aterpia nobilis (Diakonoff, 1973)
Aterpia palliata (Meyrick, 1909)
Aterpia phanerops (Diakonoff, 1960)
Aterpia praeceps (Meyrick, 1909)
Aterpia protosema (Diakonoff, 1973)
Aterpia purpurascens (Diakonoff, 1953)
Aterpia sappiroflua (Diakonoff, 1953)
Aterpia semnodryas (Meyrick, 1936)
Aterpia sieversiana (Nolcken, 1870)

See also
List of Tortricidae genera

References

External links
tortricidae.com

Olethreutini
Tortricidae genera
Taxa named by Achille Guenée